Tan Chuan-Jin (born 10 January 1969) is a Singaporean politician and former brigadier-general who has been serving as Speaker of the Parliament of Singapore since 2017. A member of the governing People's Action Party (PAP), he has been the Member of Parliament (MP) representing the Kembangan–Chai Chee division of Marine Parade GRC since 2011. 

Before entering politics, Tan served in the Singapore Army between 1987 and 2011 and attained the rank Brigadier-General. He made his political debut in the 2011 general election as part of a five-member PAP team contesting in Marine Parade GRC and they won with 56.65% of the vote. 

Since then, Tan had served as Senior Minister of State for National Development between 2012 and 2013, Minister for Manpower between 2012 and 2015, and Minister for Social and Family Development between 2015 and 2017 before relinquishing his ministerial portfolio in 2017 to serve as Speaker of the Parliament.

Education 
Tan attended Anglo-Chinese School and Raffles Junior College before graduating from the London School of Economics with a Bachelor of Science degree in economics under the Singapore Armed Forces Overseas Scholarship. 

He also completed a Master of Arts degree in defence studies at King's College London, and a Master of Public Administration degree at the National University of Singapore's Lee Kuan Yew School of Public Policy in 2008.

Career

Military career 
Tan enlisted in the Singapore Armed Forces in 1987 and was commissioned as an officer in the Singapore Army before attaining the rank Brigadier-General. During his time in the military, he held various command and staff positions, including Commanding Officer of the 3rd Guards Battalion, Army Attaché at the Singapore embassy in Jakarta, Commander of the 7th Singapore Infantry Brigade, Assistant Chief of the General Staff (Plans), Commander of the 3rd Division, and Commander of the Army Training and Doctrine Command. In the aftermath of the 2004 Indian Ocean earthquake and tsunami, Tan was the commander of the Singapore Armed Forces Humanitarian Assistance Task Force deployed to Meulaboh. He was also the chairman of the executive committee of the Singapore National Day Parade in 2009. 

On 25 March 2011, Tan retired from the Singapore Armed Forces to enter politics.

Political career 
Tan was announced as a People's Action Party (PAP) candidate joining the five-member PAP team contesting in Marine Parade GRC during the 2011 general election. After the PAP team won with 56.65% of the vote against the National Solidarity Party, Tan became a Member of Parliament representing the Kembangan–Chai Chee ward of Marine Parade GRC.

On 1 August 2012, he was appointed Senior Minister of State at the Ministry of National Development and Acting Minister for Manpower. During his tenure at the Ministry of National Development, Tan worked with heritage, nature, environmental and animal welfare groups on issues related to the Rail Corridor and Bukit Brown Cemetery. He also worked on issues which led to Sisters' Islands being designated as Singapore's first marine park, as well as amendments being made to the Animal and Birds Act.

On 1 September 2013, Tan relinquished his appointment at the Ministry of National Development and became Senior Minister of State at the Ministry of Manpower while continuing to serve as Acting Minister for Manpower. On 1 May 2014, he was promoted to full Minister. On 9 April 2015, Tan relinquished his portfolio as Minister for Manpower and became Minister for Social and Family Development as part of a Cabinet reshuffle.

During the 2015 general election, Tan joined a five-member PAP team contesting in Marine Parade GRC again and they won with 64.07% of the vote against the Workers' Party. After the election, Tan continued serving as Minister for Social and Family Development. On 11 September 2017, he resigned his Cabinet portfolio and became the 10th Speaker of Parliament after the post was vacated by Halimah Yacob when she resigned to contest in the 2017 Singaporean presidential election.

Tan retained his parliamentary seat in Kembangan–Chai Chee after his five-member PAP team contesting in Marine Parade GRC during the 2020 general election won again with 57.74% of the vote against the Workers' Party. After the election, he continued serving as Speaker of Parliament.

Personal life 
Tan is married with two children. He has been serving as the president of the Singapore National Olympic Council since 2014.

References

External links 
 Tan Chuan-Jin on Parliament of Singapore
Ministry of National Development

Members of the Cabinet of Singapore
Speakers of the Parliament of Singapore
Members of the Parliament of Singapore
People's Action Party politicians
Singaporean Christians
National University of Singapore alumni
Alumni of King's College London
Alumni of the London School of Economics
Raffles Junior College alumni
Anglo-Chinese School alumni
Singaporean people of Chinese descent
1969 births
Living people
Ministers for Manpower of Singapore
Singaporean military leaders